Patch the Pirate is an Evangelical Christian series of character-building, comical, and musical recordings for children produced by Majesty Music. These comical capers teach Christian values to children through story and song recordings, children’s choir clubs, and radio programs. Patch the Pirate is played by Ron "Patch" Hamilton, who is a popular Christian singer, songwriter, composer, evangelist, and personality. Ron Hamilton has created and published 40 Patch the Pirate Adventures including the first release Sing Along with Patch the Pirate in 1981, and the latest release in 2019 “The Final Voyage?”. Over 2 million Patch the Pirate adventures have been sold since the release of the first album. The Patch the Pirate Radio Program is recognized by the National Religious Broadcasters as the third largest religious children's programming outreach.

History
In 1978, doctors discovered cancer in Ron Hamilton's left eye resulting in the loss of the eye. After recovering from the surgery Ron received an eye patch from the surgeon. Wherever Ron went wearing the patch, children would point at him and call him a pirate. Ron decided that he would either correct children the rest of his life or embrace the fact that he was now a pirate. Before he lost his eye to cancer, Ron and his wife Shelly worked at Musical Ministries, later called Majesty Music, writing and performing sacred music in churches across the United States. After losing his eye, "Patch," as he became known, released an album of children's music. This album was wildly popular and led to the creation of the Patch the Pirate series which included music and original stories. Ron Hamilton wrote the stories and most of the songs, and his wife, Shelly, arranged the songs. The couple and their five children, Jonathan, Tara, Alyssa, Megan, and Jason, also starred on the recordings as members of Patch's crew.

After losing his eye, Ron Hamilton wrote a song entitled Rejoice in the Lord, which became one of his most widely popular songs. Other famous songs written by Ron Hamilton include Wings as Eagles, My Hope Is Jesus, Wiggle Worm, Bow the Knee, Beautiful Hands, Always the Same, Here Am I, Lord, Born to Die, Little by Little, The Poochie Lip Disease, How Can I Fear, Lord, I Need You, Servant's Heart, Clean It Up, I Am Weak, but You Are Strong, Christ Is Coming, Jonah, Call the Wambulance, That's Where Wisdom Begins, I Saw Jesus in You, A Secret Place, Cherish the Moments, "The Incredible Race!" and many more.. Ron Hamilton has also authored a number of popular Christmas and Easter cantatas including Born to Die, Klinkenschnell the Christmas Bell, Peanut Butter Christmas, The Hope of Christmas.

Majesty Music
Patch the Pirate Adventures are produced and published by Majesty Music and are sold on iTunes, Amazon, Google Play, and Spotify. Majesty Music was founded by Dr. Frank Garlock in 1973.Dr. Garlock, and his new son-in-law Ron, travelled to churches across the world speaking about music, and founded Majesty Music, Inc. to produce quality sacred music for churches. Majesty Music is widely popular in the Baptist denomination, and particularly in the Independent Fundamentalist Baptist denomination. Ron Hamilton married Dr. Garlock's daughter, Shelly, in 1975, and the couple managed Majesty Music for over 30 years. In 2014, Ron Hamilton's son-in-law and daughter, Adam Morgan and Megan Hamilton Morgan, began writing and producing the new Patch the Pirate adventures and managing the company, continuing the family tradition. In 2017, Ron Hamilton was diagnosed with early onset dementia. He is no longer able to travel with his "crew" but they still keep performing.

Discography

 Sing Along with Patch the Pirate (1981)
 Patch the Pirate Goes to Space (1982)
 Patch the Pirate Goes West (1983)
 Patch the Pirate Goes to the Jungle (1984)
 Kidnapped on I-Land (1985)
 The Great American Time Machine (1986)
 The Misterslippi River Race (1987)
 The Calliope Caper (1988)
 Camp Kookawacka Woods (1989)
 The Custards' Last Stand (1990)
 The Friend Ship Mutiny (1991)
 Once Upon a Starry Knight (1992)
 Down Under (1993)
 Harold the King (1993)
 The Evolution Revolution (1994)
 Mount Zion Marathon (1995)
 Giant Killer (1996)
 Polecat's Poison (1997)
 The Sneaky Sheik (1998)
 Afraidika Fever (1999)
 The Lone Stranger (2000)
 The Tumbleweed Opera (2001)
 Coldheartica (2002)
 Limerick the Leprechaun (2003)
 Shipwrecked on Pleasure Island (2004)
 The Kashmir Kid (2005)
 The Villain of Venice (2006)
 The Colonel's Colossal Character Quest (2007)
 Armadillo Amigos (2008)
 Kung Phooey Kid (2009)
 The Legend of Stickeyfoot (2010)
 Incrediworld (2011)
 Kingdom Chronicles (2012)
 International Spy Academy (2013)
 Kilimanjaro (2014)
 Ocean Commotion (2015)
 Operation Arctic: Viking Invasion (2016)
 Time Twisters (2017)
 The Incredible Race! (2018)
 The Final Voyage? (2019)
 Mystery Island (2020)
 Whale of a Tale (2021)

References

Christian radio dramas
American radio dramas
Children's music
Christian music